Xiangxi Tujia and Miao Autonomous Prefecture () is an autonomous prefecture of the People's Republic of China. It is located in northwestern Hunan province. It consists of one city, Jishou, and seven counties: Baojing, Fenghuang, Guzhang, Huayuan, Longshan, Luxi, Yongshun. Jishou is the capital. Of the 2,480,000 residents, 66.6% are ethnic minorities from 25 different ethnic groups, including 860,000 Tujia and 790,000 Miao.

History 
Xiangxi has a long history. The land was sparsely inhabited during the Shang dynasty, through the Warring States period up to the era of the Sui dynasty and Tang dynasty. It fell under the influence of the Chu state during the Warring States era. Later, it became part of the Western and Eastern Han dynasty. After the collapse of the Han dynasty, it came under the control of the Shu dynasty during the Three Kingdoms Period of China. Then the area became a subject of the Jin dynasty. When the Yuan dynasty was established, the region became a part of the Hubei province. Soon later, Hubei and Hunan province became one single province called Huguang. The Ming dynasty reestablished the Xiangxi Autonomous Prefecture and attached it to Hunan province.

Upon the establishment of modern China, the national government gave the region autonomous status and county level status. This meant that the provincial government had less control over the region compared to other counties.

Modern reforms 

Ever since the reforms by Deng Xiaoping, the region has developed substantially. The introduction of a large number of advanced production equipment and various types of automated production factories accelerated the growth of industries. In 2008, the total production value totaled 22,666 billion yuan.

Crop production
Agricultural products such as rice, wheat, corn, soybeans, electricity, cement, wood, cigarettes, fertilizers, yarn and cloth became primary products.

Administration

Government

The current CPC party secretary of the autonomous prefecture is Guo Zhenggui, and the current mayor is Long Xiaohua.

See also 
List of township-level divisions of Hunan

Notes

References

External links

 
Prefecture-level divisions of Hunan
Miao autonomous prefectures
Tujia autonomous prefectures